Licola may refer to:

Licola, Italy, a hamlet of Pozzuoli, in the province of Naples.
Licola, Victoria, a small town in Australia.